The Mime Order is a 2015 supernatural dystopian novel by British writer Samantha Shannon, the second in The Bone Season series.

Plot synopsis 
Paige Mahoney returns to London after escaping the prison camp of Sheol, accompanied by fellow survivors. She is forced into hiding to recover from her injuries. She reluctantly rejoins forces with Jaxon, for the dual purposes of regaining her place in the syndicate, and gaining protection from Scion. When Hector—the Underking—is found murdered, along with his gang, a power vacuum in the mime order opens. Paige wants to tell them about the Rephaim, but Jaxon blackmails her into silence. He announces a scrimmage, the winner of which will take leadership of the Unnatural Assembly. Paige decides to spread the word about the Rephaim through a penny-dreadful, written by the Sheol I survivors.

Later, Paige is accosted by Terebell Sheratan and Errai Sarin, two Rephaim searching for Warden, her former keeper. She tracks him down, and though she has not forgotten how he used her to engineer a revolt in Sheol I, she agrees to help him take down Scion and the Sargas, the family of the Rephaim blood-sovereign, who created The Republic of Scion, and is using it to control the clairvoyants.

Paige is now beset on all sides: She discovers that the pamphlet she planned, The Rephaite Revelation, was edited in a way the contradicts its purpose, making the Rephaim seem to be god-like saviors. Among the voyants, the Abbess has taken power, having murdered Hector and his gang, and Paige discovers she runs a chilling gray market, through which voyants are sold to Scion. All the while, she is balancing her alliance with Warden and evading capture by Scion.

During the scrimmage, Paige and Jaxon fight together, and defeat all the other hopefuls to the throne. But just when Jaxon is about to be declared Underlord, Paige challenges him, and wins by briefly possessing him and forcing him to surrender. Her fellow Sheol I survivor, Ivy, discloses to the court that she was mollisher to the Rag and Bone Man, who was responsible for trading voyants to the Rephaim, together with several mime leaders, including Hector and the Abbess. The Abbess then tries to kill Paige, but is shot down by members of the Unnatural Assembly. Paige, now Underqueen, decrees that the syndicate of clairvoyants shall henceforth be named the MIme Order.

But Paige's problems are far from over, as all across the city, transmission screens show three of the Sheol I survivors awaiting execution, pending Paige turning herself in to Nashira Sargas, blood-sovereign of the Rephaim. She attempts to bargain with Nashira, approaching her in a possessed body, but Nashira executes Paige's friends, and exposes that her new ally is none other than Jaxon, with whom she has a history.

Reception 
In her very positive NPR review, Janet Ciabbatari writes: "Shannon's haunting dystopian universe is rich in detail, consistent, suffused with familiar afternotes. Just when the bloodshed seems over the top, she turns to shimmering descriptions of Paige's dangerously illicit tie to Warden. When Paige seems toughest, Shannon reminds us of her empathy for the downtrodden." In a more lukewarm review, Kirkus Reviews predicted that Shannon fans would not be disappointed by the "propulsive plot", noting that the action of the book outshines the prose, which is rated as "serviceable".

Calling the novel "a MUST", The Guardian review enthuses that "there is no question whether to pick up The Bone Season". The review is equally laudatory about the characters, calling them wonderfully imagined, noting especially how brilliant the character of Jaxon is, and how intelligent and respect-inspiring is the main character, Paige. The Independent joins the line of rave reviews, asserting that the book would leave "addicts craving a third hit". calling the whodunit plot "gripping", the review concludes that "Shannon’s ability to take classic tropes, such as forbidden love and dystopian societies, and give them a well-knuckled twist is to be admired – books one and two have demonstrated that she looks set to become a trailblazer for young talent."

The Mime Order was a 2015 Goodreads Choice Award Nominee for Fantasy.

References

External links 
 Official website

2015 British novels
Dystopian novels
2015 fantasy novels
Novels set in London
Novels set in the future
Bloomsbury Publishing books